Megafroneta is a genus of South Pacific dwarf spiders that was first described by A. D. Blest in 1979.  it contains only three species, found in New Zealand: M. dugdaleae, M. elongata, and M. gigas.

See also
 List of Linyphiidae species (I–P)

References

Araneomorphae genera
Linyphiidae
Spiders of New Zealand